EO Aurigae is an eclipsing binary of Algol type in the northern constellation of Auriga. With a combined apparent magnitude of 7.71, it is too faint to be seen with the unaided eye.

The eclipsing binary nature of the star was detected in 1943 by Sergei Gaposchkin at Harvard College Observatory. It consists of a pair of B-type main sequence stars orbiting each other with a period of 4.0656 days. During the eclipse of the primary star, the combined magnitude drops by 0.57; the eclipse of the secondary component drops the magnitude by 0.33.

References

External links
 HIP 24744
 Image EO Aurigae

Auriga (constellation)
Algol variables
034333
Eclipsing binaries
024744
B-type main-sequence stars
Aurigae, EO
Durchmusterung objects